Bound, is a 2018 Nigerian romantic drama film directed by Frank Rajah Arase and produced by Lilian Afegbai. The film stars Rita Dominic and Enyinna Nwigwe in the lead roles whereas Joyce Kalu, Nicole Banner, Duke Emmanuel, and Neye Balogun made supportive roles. The film revolves around Chinenye, a 35 beautiful career woman unable to get married but she met Elochukwu and made unconditional love towards her.

The film has been shot in Enugu, Nigeria. The film made its premier on 16 March 2018 at the Filmhouse IMAX Cinema Lekki, Lagos. The film received mixed reviews from critics and screened worldwide. The film won the Best Indigenous Language (Igbo) award at the 2018 Africa Magic Viewers Choice Awards.

Cast
 Rita Dominic as Chineye
 Enyinna Nwigwe as Elochukwu 
 Joyce Kalu
 Nichole Banna		
 Duke Emmanuel		
 Neye Balogun		
 Stan K. Amandi 		 
 Prince Nwafor

References

External links 
 

2018 films
English-language Nigerian films
2018 romantic drama films
2010s English-language films
Nigerian romantic drama films
Africa Magic Viewers' Choice Awards winners